The Municipality of Brezovica is a municipality in central Slovenia, just south of its capital Ljubljana. It has approximately 9,300 inhabitants. Its administrative centre is the settlement of Brezovica pri Ljubljani. It is the central municipality in the Ljubljana Marsh. The entire municipality is part of the traditional region of Inner Carniola and is now included in the Central Slovenia Statistical Region.

Geography

To the east, it borders the municipalities of Ljubljana and Ig. To the south, it borders the Municipality of Cerknica, to the west the municipalities of Borovnica and Vrhnika, and to the north the Municipality of Dobrova–Polhov Gradec.

Settlements
In addition to the municipal seat of Brezovica pri Ljubljani, the municipality also includes the following settlements:

 Dolenja Brezovica
 Gorenja Brezovica
 Goričica pod Krimom
 Jezero
 Kamnik pod Krimom
 Notranje Gorice
 Planinca
 Plešivica
 Podpeč
 Podplešivica
 Preserje
 Prevalje pod Krimom
 Rakitna
 Vnanje Gorice
 Žabnica

History
The area has been inhabited since ancient times. People known as the Lake Dwellers, described by the Slovene writer Janez Jalen in his novel Bobri (Beavers), arrived when the marshland was still covered by a lake. Later, the area covered by the present municipality was crossed by Roman roads, traces of which are still visible, near Rakitna for example. The Ljubljanica River was navigated by boatmen. The Romans redirected it towards Podpeč, a village known for its good quality stone. The nearby forests and the settlements proximity to Ljubljana, have positively influenced the development of agriculture, trade, and enterprise in the area. Many old crafts, such as lime, stone, and wood processing, and wickerwork have survived to the present day.

Stone from Podpeč, known as Podpeč marble, was used in many prominent monuments in Ljubljana by the architect Jože Plečnik, such as the National and University Library of Slovenia. The quarry is now protected and only small excavations are allowed.

References

External links

Municipality of Brezovica on Geopedia
Official webpage of the municipality

 
Brezovica
1994 establishments in Slovenia